Krushare is a village in Bulgaria. It is situated in  Sliven Municipality, Sliven Province.

References

Villages in Sliven Province